The Province of Fiume (or Province of Carnaro) was a province of the Kingdom of Italy from 1924 to 1943, then under control of the Italian Social Republic and German Wehrmacht from 1943 to 1945. Its capital was the city of Fiume. It took the other name after the Gulf of Carnaro (Golfo del Carnaro). 

The province was divided into 13 municipalities and in 1938 had an area of 1,121.29 km ² with a population of 109,018 inhabitants and a density of 109 inhabitants / km ².

History 

Fiume had been occupied since September 1919 by a private force led by the nationalist poet Gabriele D'Annunzio, disilluded with Italy's management of the Fiume question after the end of the First World War. D'Annunzio's initiative was a personal one, however, and the Italian army evacuated the poet's soldiers. With the Treaty of Rapallo Fiume and its immediate surroundings, counting around 50,000 Italian-speakers and 13,000 Croatian-speakers, were declared a free city.

Nationalist and fascists kept on pushing for a direct annexation of Fiume; after a staged coup in 1922, the city was militarily occupied by the Regio Esercito. The province was finally created in 1924, with the Treaty of Rome, when the territory of the former State was split up between Yugoslavia and Italy, with the latter receiving Fiume.

The new province was formed by the coastal zone of the Free State, which became the district (circondario) of Fiume; and by the district of Volosca-Abbazia, formerly within the Province of Pola. In 1928, districts were abolished and two other municipalities passed under the jurisdiction of Fiume, Matteria and Castelnuovo d'Istria.

From April 1941 to September 1943 the Italian Province of Fiume was enlarged after the victory of the Axis powers over Yugoslavia, with the addition of the Fiuman eastern hinterland and the Carnaro isles of Veglia and Arbe. Some among the local inhabitants started a resistance movement against Italian occupation in these newly annexed zones; Italian military authorities tried to repress this objection with severe measures.

When the Armistice of Italy with the Allied was signed, on 8 September 1943, the former province of Fiume fell under Hitler's Germany (OZAK), and Carnaro and Fiume led one of Italy's highest death rates from Nazi death camps, fourth behind Gorizia, Florence, and Genoa. Amongst those arrested was Giovanni Palatucci, the Italian questore of Fiume, who saved the lives of thousands of Jews. He also created a Committee comprising both Italians and Slavic partisans, as well as Jews, as an attempt to safeguard the independence of Fiume once Germany would have been defeated. He was deported to Dachau and died there in 1945.

Following Palatucci's dismissal, his powers of questore directly passed to GESTAPO, and Italian sovereignty on the area was seriously compromised; in April 1945, Josip Broz Tito's partisans invaded the province with little to no opposition and claimed it for Yugoslavia. Only in 1947, however, was the Italian Province of Fiume formally abolished in accordance with international law and its entry into Yugoslavia was acknowledged.

Nowadays, its former territory roughly corresponds to Primorje-Gorski Kotar County in Croatia.

Geography

Mountains

Rivers
Eneo
Timavo

Administrative division

Municipalities

The provincial capital, the city of Fiume, was annexed to Italy with the Treaty of Rome, (27 January 1924), and the formal Italian annexation occurred on 16 March 1924, and the Rijeka province between April 1941 and September 1943, when it included the islands of Krk and Rab. Amongst the municipalities with the highest percentage of Italian population was Laurana, followed by Volosoca, with the town of Opatija. The majority of inhabitants of the municipalities besides the Italian presence, were ethnic Croats. An exception to this was Opatija, where there was no ethnic majority but were over-represented by Italians, Croats, and Slovenes, and a small number of ethnic German.

Towns and villages
Fiume (Rijeka): Borgomarina, Cosala (Kozala), Drenova (Drenova), Plasse (Plase).
Abbazia (Opatija): Apriano (Veprinac), Crissizza (Križevice), Lipovizza (Lipovica), Pogliane (Poljane), Preluca (Preluka), Scherbici (Škrbići), Slatina (Slatina), Vassania (Vašanska), Volosca (Volosko ).
Draga di Moschiena (Mošćenička Draga): Bersezio (Brseč), Cala (Kalac), Obers (Obrš), Riva Mošćenička (Krai), Ruins (Ruins), San Pietro (St. Peter), St. Antonio (St. Anton), Selza (Flint ), Trebisca (Trebišća), Monte Maggiore (Učka), Valsantamarina (Moscenicka Draga).
Laurana (Lovran): Bacova, Cali, Cosuli, Dobrecchi, Draga Laurana, Giagnetici, Ica, Monte, Oprino, Carnaro of Saint Francis, Saint-Roch Ligani, Smarici, Tuliano, Visozze, Ucovazzi.
Primano (Prem): Berdo San Giovanni, Bittigne di Sopra, Bittigne di Sotto, Ceglie, Mt Chilovi, Ratečevo in Monte Sméria.
Matteria (Materija): Artuise, Bresovizza Marenzi, Bresovoberdo, Calcizza, Cosiane, Coticcina, Gelovizza, Golazzo, Gradiscizza, Loccegrande, Marcossina, Mersane, Orecca, Ostrovizza, Pusane, Rosizze, Scandaussina, Slivia of Castelnuovo, Tow, Tatre, Tublie, Vodice Castelnuovo .
Castel Iablanizza (Jablanica): Cottésevo, Iasena of Bisterza, Terciane, Verbizza, Verbovo, Villa Podigraie, Zabice Castelvecchio di Sopra Zemon, Zemon di Sotto.
Villa del Nevoso (Ilirska Bistrica):Torrenova Bucovizza Large, Small Bucovizza, Caries, Cossese, Merecce, Poglie, Postegna, Postegnesca, Sarecce, Sarecizza Val Timavo, Sose, Tomigna, Topolza, Bisterza of Torrenova .
Knežak: Baccia of Bisterza, Coritenza of Bisterza, Drescozze, Sagòria San Martin, San Giorgio, Sémbie, Taborgrande, Tabor Sémbie.
Jelšane: Berdo of Elsane, Berze, Cracinanova, Dolegne of Elsane, Fabice, Lippa of Elsane, Passiaco, Ruppa, Sappiane, Sussa, Villanova.
Mattuglie (Matulji): Bergut Large, Small Bergut, Biscopi, Bresa, Corsenico, Criva, Cuceli, Cusnici, Ferlania, Francici, Gai, Gerzancici, Ghersetici, Gerzici, Giordani, Giussici Border, Michelici, fungal, Monte, Mussici, Pereni, Pobri, Possici, Pucari, Pussevi, Pusi, Ruccavazzo High, Low Ruccavazzo, Russici, Serapena, Snidari, Suonecchia, Suseni, Tertini, Varlieni, Vissici.
Castelnuovo (Podgrad): Crussizza of Castelnuovo, Eriacci, Gabrega, Giavorie, Gradischie of Cast, Mune Large, Small Mune, Obrovo Santa Maria, Paulizza, Pobese, Pogliane, Pregara, Prelose Sant'Egidio, Racizze, Rittomece, Sabogna, Seiane, Starada, Studena in Monte Zaielse.
Clana (Klana): Isera, San Rocco, Scalnizza, Studena, Zidovje.

Districts
Bisterza, divided into Bisterza and Torrenova of Bisterza.
Fiume, divided into the wards of Abbazia and Fiume.

Infrastructure

Roads
The province was covered by the following highways:

State Road 14 in Venezia Giulia
The highway of Bisterza 59 (SS 59)
The highway 60, Monte Maggiore (SS 60)
Highway 61 on liburnica

Railway
St Peters Krasu-Rijeka railway.
Zagreb-Rijeka railway/

Ports
Port of Rijeka

Languages 

The people spoke different languages and dialects, amongst which include:

Italian, the official language
Venetian, spoken on the coast
Slovene, in the dialect spoken in istrsko of ' Istria in the north inner.
Croatian, in the dialect spoken in chakaviansko of ' Istria Eastern.

Religion 

Almost the entire population professed Catholicism and looked towards the Roman Catholic Archdiocese of Fiume a suffragan of the time, or the Roman Catholic Archdiocese of Gorizia, of the Ecclesiastical Region of Triveneto.

See also
Italian Regency of Carnaro
Charter of Carnaro
Free State of Fiume
List of governors and heads of state of Fiume
TIGR
Free Territory of Trieste
Italianization
Roman Catholic Archdiocese of Gorizia

Bibliography
Rodogno, David. Mediterranean, the new order. Ed Basic Books. Turin, 2003

Notes and references

Notes

References 

Fiume
Italian irredentism
Mediterranean port cities and towns in Croatia
Populated places in Primorje-Gorski Kotar County
Treaties of the Kingdom of Italy (1861–1946)
Wars involving Italy
Italian Social Republic